Indien is a 1993 Austrian tragicomic road movie directed by Paul Harather. It was Austria's submission to the 66th Academy Awards for the Academy Award for Best Foreign Language Film, but it was not nominated. It is one of the most successful films of Austrian Cinema and has developed a cult following.

Plot 
The main characters are Heinz Bösel (Josef Hader) and Kurt Fellner (Alfred Dorfer), who work for the tourist office in Lower Austria assessing guesthouses. Bösel is fond of beer and occasionally ill-behaved, while Fellner is more intellectual and refined, constantly asking his colleague Trivial Pursuit questions.  However, they gradually bond as they travel around Austria.

Later in the film, Fellner is taken ill and is diagnosed with advanced testicular cancer.  Bösel helps Fellner fulfil his last wishes, which include playing on an organ and going into the woods one last time to hear the birds.  Fellner dies in his friend's arms, but the film ends optimistically when Bösel meets an Indian man who seems to be the reincarnation of his friend.

Awards 
 Thomas Pluch Screenplay Prize to Alfred Dorfer and Josef Hader, 1993
 Grand prize of the Santa Barbara International Film Festival in 1994
 At the Filmfestival Max Ophüls Preis in 1994, Prize of the Saarland Premier to director Paul Harather, and audience prize
 Österreichischer Filmpreis in 1994

Cast 
 Josef Hader - Heinzi Bösel 
 Alfred Dorfer - Kurt Fellner 
 Karl Markovics - Kirchingerwirt

See also
 Cinema of Austria
 List of submissions to the 66th Academy Awards for Best Foreign Language Film
 List of Austrian submissions for the Academy Award for Best Foreign Language Film

References

External links

1993 films
1993 comedy-drama films
1990s German-language films
Austrian comedy-drama films